Robert Paul (born 17 October 1984) is a German former professional footballer who played as a left-back.

References

External links
 
 

1984 births
Living people
People from Sömmerda
People from Bezirk Erfurt
German footballers
Association football fullbacks
Footballers from Thuringia
FC Carl Zeiss Jena players
SV Werder Bremen II players
SV Wacker Burghausen players
SV Wehen Wiesbaden players
SV Elversberg players
SV Babelsberg 03 players
FSV Zwickau players
VFC Plauen players
2. Bundesliga players
3. Liga players
Regionalliga players